Andy Livingston (born October 21, 1944) is an American former professional football player who was a running back in the National Football League (NFL). He played professionally for the Chicago Bears and the New Orleans Saints.

Early life
Livingston was born to L.B. Livingston and Annie Livingston in Eufaula, Oklahoma. He attended Mesa High School in Arizona but did not graduate. He was an All-American tailback in 1961, and was the Arizona high school player of the year. He also attended Phoenix College.

Professional career 
He was nineteen years old when he first played for the Chicago Bears. He is the youngest player in NFL history to score a touchdown (20 years, 53 days). The NFL granted him a hardship exemption, enabling him to leave college early. He also attended Phoenix College.

Livingston played for the Chicago Bears from 1964 until 1968. He was traded to the New Orleans Saints in 1969, and played until 1970 when he retired from football after suffering a knee injury.

Life after the NFL
Livingston helped found the nonprofit foundation "Kids 4 Today" in 1991.

Personal life
Livingston currently resides in Mesa, Arizona with his wife and kids, working as a CPA.  Livingston's brother Warren Livingston is a former professional American football cornerback. He played six seasons for the Dallas Cowboys of the National Football League.

References

External links
 The New York Times: Sports of The Times; In 1964, a Teenager Showed He Could Play
 Pro-Football-Reference.Com
 databaseFootball.com

1944 births
Living people
People from Eufaula, Oklahoma
American football running backs
Chicago Bears players
New Orleans Saints players
Eastern Conference Pro Bowl players
Players of American football from Arizona
Players of American football from Oklahoma
Mesa High School alumni